Travis Cortez Mays (born June 19, 1968) is an American women's basketball coach and former professional player who was the women's head coach for Southern Methodist University (SMU) from 2016 until 2021. Mays was selected by the Sacramento Kings in the first round (14th overall pick) of the 1990 NBA draft. Born in Ocala, Florida, he played basketball for Vanguard High School before enrolling at the University of Texas to compete for the Longhorns. After his time in the NBA, Mays played professional basketball in several leagues in Europe.

Amateur career
Mays went to Vanguard High School where he was a scholastic All-America standout, and he then proceeded to play basketball for the University of Texas. Mays and teammates Lance Blanks and Joey Wright were known as the "BMW – The Ultimate Scoring Machine" during the 1989–90 basketball season. That Longhorn team advanced to the Elite Eight in the 1990 NCAA Men's Division I Basketball Tournament.

Mays ranks second in UT men's basketball all-time scoring (2,279 points) and also is second in Southwest Conference all-time scoring. He was the first player to earn back-to-back SWC Player of the Year honors. Mays' career scoring average was 18.4 points per game. He scored in double-figures in 100 of 124 career games and was the only UT men's player in history to score more than 700 points in a season at the end of his Longhorn career, having scored 743 points as a junior and 772 as a senior. His single-season scoring record has subsequently been broken by Kevin Durant. In the 1989–90 season that ended in the Elite Eight, Mays had a scoring average of 24.1 points per game as a senior. In 2002, he was inducted into the UT Men's Athletics Hall of Honor.

Professional career
Mays was selected by the Sacramento Kings with the 14th pick of the 1990 NBA draft. During his rookie campaign for the Kings, he was named to the NBA All-Rookie Second Team, averaging 14.3 points per game in 64 games. He spent the next two seasons with the Atlanta Hawks, where two games into his second season, he ruptured both tendons in his right ankle and was out for the remainder of the season. He returned for his final NBA season the next year. Mays had an NBA career scoring average of 11.1 points per game.

Mays' professional career extended to European and international basketball, as he played in Greece, Israel, Turkey, and Italy. In 1994 Mays signed with Greek club Panionios BC, where he would spend the entire season. In the Greek League, Mays averaged 23.8 points, 2.4 rebounds and 2.6 assists per game. Highlights of his European career include his selection to the European All-Star Game, leading Panionios to the European Championship final eight with 27.5 points per game, and a First Team All-Star selection (1999–2001) on Italy's Siena squad. He retired as a player in 2002.

Coaching career
Mays spent the 2002–04 seasons coaching and scouting as an assistant coach for the WNBA's San Antonio Silver Stars franchise. He also coached AAU boys' basketball for the Tennessee/Alabama "Pump" team in the summer of 2003. From 2004 to 2007, he returned to his alma mater and served as an assistant coach under Jody Conradt for the Texas Longhorns women's basketball team. Mays' primary duties were working with UT's guard play and recruiting. He was instrumental in signing, among others, Erika Arriaran, Crystal Boyd, Earnesia Williams, and Brittainey Raven.

After Conradt retired, Mays worked in the same capacity with the Louisiana State University women's team from 2007 to 2011. He then spent one year as an assistant coach for the University of Georgia women's basketball team. From 2012 to 2016, he returned again to UT as the associate head coach under new head coach Karen Aston. In 2016, he became the head coach at SMU. He was let go on March 8, 2021 after 5 seasons at SMU.

Head coaching record

Career achievements

As a player
 Southwest Conference Player of the Year (1989, 1990)
 Three-year All-Southwest Conference (1987–1990)
 UT Men's Athletics Hall of Honor (2002)
 European All-Star (1994, 1995)
 First Team All-Star (Italy) 1999–2001

Personal
Mays earned a Bachelor of Arts degree in psychology from UT in 1990. He received Italian citizenship through his wife Mirella, herself of Italian ancestry.

Notes

References

External links
 NBA.com Historical Profile
 Travis Mays - NBA stats @ Basketball-Reference.com
 Basketpedya.com Profile
 Google cache of "Mays shows women the way" @ dailytexanonline.com (an article on Mays' coaching career)

1968 births
Living people
African-American basketball players
American expatriate basketball people in Greece
American expatriate basketball people in Israel
American expatriate basketball people in Italy
American expatriate basketball people in Turkey
American men's basketball players
American women's basketball coaches
Atlanta Hawks players
Basketball coaches from Florida
Basketball players from Florida
Georgia Lady Bulldogs basketball coaches
Greek Basket League players
Ironi Ramat Gan players
Israeli Basketball Premier League players
LSU Lady Tigers basketball coaches
Mens Sana Basket players
Olimpia Basket Pistoia players
Panionios B.C. players
Rochester Renegade players
Sacramento Kings draft picks
Sacramento Kings players
Shooting guards
SMU Mustangs women's basketball coaches
Sportspeople from Ocala, Florida
Texas Longhorns men's basketball players
Texas Longhorns women's basketball coaches
Tuborg Pilsener basketball players
Universiade gold medalists for the United States
Universiade medalists in basketball
21st-century African-American people
20th-century African-American sportspeople